Rodrigo Antônio Mathiola (born 14 August 1997) is a Brazilian professional footballer who plays for Vitória de Setúbal as a midfielder.

Club career
Mathiola made his professional debut with Vitória de Setúbal in a 0-0 Primeira Liga tie with on 23 August 2019.

References

External links

 ZeroZero Profile

1997 births
Living people
Sportspeople from Santa Catarina (state)
Brazilian footballers
Association football midfielders
Primeira Liga players
Campeonato de Portugal (league) players
Vitória F.C. players
Brazilian expatriate footballers
Expatriate footballers in Brazil
Expatriate footballers in Portugal